Bertha Baraldi Briseño (born 3 February 1948) is a Mexican diver. She competed at the 1968 Summer Olympics and the 1972 Summer Olympics.

References

External links
 

1948 births
Living people
Mexican female divers
Olympic divers of Mexico
Divers at the 1968 Summer Olympics
Divers at the 1972 Summer Olympics
Pan American Games competitors for Mexico
Divers at the 1967 Pan American Games
Divers at the 1971 Pan American Games
Divers from Mexico City
21st-century Mexican women
20th-century Mexican women